Baltic News Network (BNN) is a Baltic news website.
It was founded on September 1, 2010, providing online news portals, mainly reporting for and about the Baltic region, Latvia, Lithuania, Estonia. It is published by Latvia Baltic News Network.

The Baltic News Network GmbH is registered in Austria. It was founded by Fred Zimmer.

The Baltic News Network is a member of the Independent Media Association.

History
BNN was founded on 1 September 2010 by Fred Zimmer to counter perceived Russian disinformation, and emerged as a respected news source for the Baltic region. Based around predominantly selling stories to newspapers in the Baltic region, it has come to be recognized as an important political news source.

References

External links
 

Mass media companies of Latvia
Baltic states